Software Bisque, Inc. (formerly named Computer Assist Services) is a corporation based in Golden, Colorado that develops robotics telescope mounts and accessories and publishes software used in astronomy. It was founded in 1984 by current president and CEO, Stephen M. Bisque.

History
Bisque initially developed and marketed custom financial software and also sold a DOS-based astronomy program named TheSky. At that time, the company was based in Bisque's home in Golden, Colorado.

In 1990, Bisque hired his brothers Thomas, Daniel and Matthew. Together they ported TheSky for DOS to Windows 3.0. In 1992, TheSky for Windows was released. The product has been under continuous development since it was first released in the early 1980s; the current version is known as TheSkyX.

Products
Software Bisque has since developed and sold many astronomy-related products, including:
TheSky, TheSkyX Astronomy Software, Camera Add On, Dome Add On, and TPoint Add On
TheSky Pocket Edition for Windows Mobile devices
CCDSoft, a program for the acquisition and development of CCD images
TPoint for Windows, telescope analysis and pointing correction software
Orchestrate, a program for automating multiple astronomy devices, allowing fully automatic operation and data acquisition
Seeker, an OpenGL three-dimensional solar system simulator
AutomaDome, astronomical dome control software
PrecisionPEC, periodic error correction modeling software
Paramount ME, Paramount ME II, Paramount MX, Paramount MYT German equatorial telescope mounts, and the Paramount Taurus equatorial fork mounts (models 400, 500 and 600), all models include the Paramount Software Suite for integrated software control on Mac, Windows and Linux operating systems
BisqueTCS, a dual-axis DC servomotor telescope motion control system

Amateurs have discovered over 500 new objects (including comets, minor planets, supernovas, and cataclysmic variable stars) using these products.

References

External links
 

Software companies based in Colorado
Companies based in Golden, Colorado
Software companies of the United States